A New Tide is the sixth studio album by the English indie rock band Gomez released on 30 March 2009 by ATO Records. The album was produced by the band as well as Brian Deck and received average reviews from music critics.

Reception
Initial critical response to A New Tide was generally average. At Metacritic, which assigns a normalized rating out of 100 to reviews from mainstream critics, the album has received a score of 61, based on 17 reviews.

The album debuted at number 60 on the Billboard 200, selling 10,000 copies in its first week.

Track listing
All tracks by Gomez except where noted

"Mix" – 4:16
"Little Pieces" – 3:24
"If I Ask You Nicely" – 3:07
"Lost Track" – 4:00
"Win Park Slope" – 4:20
"Bone Tired" – 2:17
"Airstream Driver" (Gomez, Hurley, Tim Rutili) – 3:56
"Natural Reaction" – 4:16
"Very Strange" – 4:43
"Other Plans" – 4:24
"Sunset Gates" – 4:58

Personnel
 Ian Ball – vocals, guitar
 Ben Ottewell – vocals, guitar
 Paul Blackburn – bass
 Tom Gray – vocals, guitar, keyboards
 Olly Peacock – drums, synths, computers

References

External links
 A New Tide on ATO Records
 New Album!!! What the F*@k! on GomezJournal

2009 albums
Gomez (band) albums
ATO Records albums
Albums produced by Brian Deck